The European Organisation for the Safety of Air Navigation, commonly known as Eurocontrol (stylised EUROCONTROL), is an international organisation working to achieve safe and seamless air traffic management across Europe. Founded in 1960, Eurocontrol currently has 41 member states and is headquartered in Brussels, Belgium. It has several local sites as well, including an Innovation Hub in Brétigny-sur-Orge, France, the Aviation Learning Centre (ALC) in Luxembourg, and the Maastricht Upper Area Control Centre (MUAC) in Maastricht, the Netherlands. The organisation employs approximately two thousand people, and operates with an annual budget in excess of half a billion Euro.

Although Eurocontrol is not an agency of the European Union, the EU has delegated parts of its Single European Sky regulations to Eurocontrol, making it the central organisation for coordination and planning of air traffic control for all of Europe. The EU itself is a signatory of Eurocontrol and all EU member states are presently also members of Eurocontrol. The organisation works with national authorities, air navigation service providers, civil and military airspace users, airports, and other organisations. Its activities involve all gate-to-gate air navigation service operations: strategic and tactical flow management, controller training, regional control of airspace, safety-proofed technologies and procedures, and collection of air navigation charges.

History

The Eurocontrol Convention was signed in 1960 and ratified in 1963. Before the Convention entered into force in 1963, there were already indications that the matter of national sovereignty would complicate the full implementation of the organisation's founding mission. The first European plan for a harmonised air traffic control (ATC) system, proposed in 1962, was beset by the refusal of both France and Britain to comply, largely due to reasons closely linked with their national military airspace control. The other four original members (the Federal Republic of Germany, Belgium, the Netherlands and Luxembourg) agreed in 1964 to set up a single international air traffic control centre to manage their upper airspace, settling in the Dutch city of Maastricht.

The European Parliament at the time expressed concern about the lack of clear intergovernmental agreements to ensure common air traffic control services across the continent. In 1979, Eurocontrol signed a working cooperation agreement with the European Commission, attempting to create a synergy of Eurocontrol's technical expertise and EU's regulatory authorities. Several initiatives originating in this period become a lasting element of the organisation, such as the Eurocontrol forecasting service, which became STATFOR, as well as the Aeronautical Information Service. By 1986, the pressure on the European ATC network was so big that a new, wider mandate was already being considered for Eurocontrol, with much of the initiative coming from ECAC’s Ministers of Transport.  Subsequently, ECAC urged all of its member states to join Eurocontrol.

A revised Eurocontrol Convention was signed in 1997, renewing the organisation's optimism for greater political support, surpassing the original vision of the 1960 Convention. In June 1998, Eurocontrol, the European Space Agency (ESA) and the European Commission (EC) also signed an agreement formalising cooperation in the realm of satellite navigation systems and services. In 1999 the European Commission presented its plan for a Single European Sky (SES) to the European Parliament, followed by two high-Level groups (HLG). The HLG reports on SES led to the establishment of the European Aviation Safety Agency (EASA) and reinforced the European Commission's role as the sole European aviation safety regulator, while acknowledging Eurocontrol's technical expertise in the implementation of said regulations.

The early 2000s were marred by several fatal accidents in Europe, such as the 2001 Linate Airport disaster and the 2002 Überlingen mid-air collision, both of which were related to air traffic navigation shortcomings. The pressure was further compounded by the September 11 attacks, increasing the need for a rapid Europe-wide regulatory and coordinating body. By May 2003, Eurocontrol and NATO had signed a memorandum of cooperation, followed by a similar memorandum with the European Commission in December 2003. In February 2004, Eurocontrol started work on first mandates from the European Commission and in April 2004, it adopted the Single European Sky Regulations (Package 1). In March 2006, the European Commission's Single European Sky ATM Research (SESAR) Program was launched by the Stakeholder Consultation Group (SCG) under Eurocontrol's aegis.

Functions and centres
Eurocontrol provides a set of different services:

 Maastricht Upper Area Control Centre (MUAC)
 Network Manager Operations Centre (NMOC) – coordinates flight plans and actual traffic.
 EAD – centralised access to AIS information.
 Central Route Charges Office (CRCO) – collects en-route (and aerodrome approach) charges on behalf of Air Navigation Service providers (ANSPs).
 Eurocontrol Innovation Hub (EIH)– research, simulations, drones and UAM.
 EUROCONTROL Aviation Learning Centre (ALC) – training and e-learning.

Maastricht Upper Area Control Centre
Eurocontrol's Maastricht Upper Area Control Centre (MUAC), ICAO designator EDYY, located at Maastricht Aachen Airport, provides air traffic control for traffic above 24,500 ft over Belgium, Luxembourg, the Netherlands, and north-west Germany. In 2017 it became the first multinational, cross-border, civil-military, air navigation service provider since it integrated the military air traffic control of the German and Dutch upper airspace.

It is the third busiest upper area area control centre (ACC) in Europe after the London Area Control Centre and Karlsruhe ACC in terms of traffic numbers, but the first in terms of flight hours and distance.

MUAC has put in operation innovative technology and productivity enhancements: a new generation Flight Data Processing System, Integrated Flow Management Position, the Short Term Conflict Alert (STCA), Controller Pilot Data Link Communications (CPDLC) and stripless controller working positions.

Typically, air traffic control sectors at MUAC can handle 55 or more flights per hour. The average flight duration is approximately 21 minutes and typically 80% of the traffic is climbing from or descending to the major European airports of London, Brussels, Paris, Frankfurt, Amsterdam and Berlin.
Maastricht UAC has undoubtedly one of the most complex airspace structures in the world and the traffic flow (up to 5,670 aircraft a day) can be disrupted by the many surrounding military airspaces.

Membership criteria

To be considered for membership of Eurocontrol, a country must meet all of the following criteria:

 Be European
 Member of the Council of Europe
 Have existing accreditation to both ICAO and ECAC

List of members

Comprehensive Agreement States
In addition to membership, EUROCONTROL also concludes the so-called Comprehensive Agreements, which enhances the organisation's cooperation with non-European countries that are closely tied to the continent's aviation network.

See also

 Air travel disruption after the 2010 Eyjafjallajökull eruption
 Controlled and Harmonised Aeronautical Information Network (CHAIN)
 E-Learning Developers' Community of Practice
 European Aviation Safety Agency (EASA)
 European Civil Aviation Conference (ECAC)
 European Cockpit Association
 European Common Aviation Area (ECAA)
 The European Convergence and Implementation Plan (ECIP) 
 List of the busiest airports in Europe by passenger traffic
 Single European Sky
 SKYbrary
 Weather Information Exchange Model

References

External links
 Official site
  
 "Being in control at Eurocontrol", article in Crossroads by Rinnie Oey
 Executive Overview: Jane's Air Traffic Control
 Skyway magazine

Aviation authorities
Organizations based in Europe
Air traffic controller schools
Air traffic control in Europe
Organizations established in 1960
International organisations based in Belgium